Cristina Antonieta Sigcho Junco (born 27 July 1980) is an Ecuadorian former footballer. She has been a member of the Ecuador women's national team.

Club career
Sigcho has played for the Guayas selection in Ecuador.

International career
Sigcho capped for Ecuador at senior level during the 2006 South American Women's Football Championship.

References

1980 births
Living people
Ecuadorian women's footballers
Ecuador women's international footballers
21st-century Ecuadorian women
Women's association footballers not categorized by position